Jiangzhou Cave System is a cave system near Jiangzhou township, in Fengshan County, Guangxi, China.

It is on the land of Leye-Fengshan Unesco Geopark.

See also
List of caves in China
List of longest caves

References

Caves of Guangxi
Archaeological sites in China